Chakhokhbili is a traditional Georgian dish of stewed chicken, tomato with fresh herbs.

Its name comes from the Georgian word ხოხობი (khokhobi) which means pheasant.

References

Georgian words and phrases
Cuisine of Georgia (country)